Freenet is a personal mobile radio network in Germany. It was originally introduced in 1996 as a product name of Motorola and uses part of the frequency spectrum of the former Telekom C-Netz carphone network.

History
The original frequency allocation for Freenet encompassed three channels, each with a 12.5 kHz spacing. In January 2007, three additional channels were added, bringing the total up to six.

The ordinance only permits handheld transceivers which must not permit an effective radiated power (ERP) of 1 W. 

Originally, the Freenet frequencies were allocated until the end of 2005. The Federal Network Agency has extended this allocation until 31 January 2025.

Specification and Radios 
With the maximum permitted ERP of 1W, a range of 3 km can be assumed. Due to the lower frequencies in the VHF band, signal attenuation from objects, such as houses and trees, is not as high as in the UHF band used by SRD and PMR446 radios.

Only specially certified and licensed transceivers may be used; the manufacturer must provide a declaration of conformity as well as a concise manual in German and a CE mark. The user is not permitted to modify the device. The Federal Network Agency has laid out strict parameters for modulation, bandwidth and channel spacing in its ordinance.

To be observed is, that relatively high prices for Freenet devices have kept away domestic users from the service. All radios, which can transmit optional on other frequencies or / and switchable power are prohibited by the Federal Network Agency. So the number of legal available devices is mutch smaller than in UHF PMR. Only a small number of companies produce radio for the Freenet-service, due to the small market.  Kenwood, Motorola, Retevis and a German re-seller, selling modified Wouxun radios under the brand "Team Tecom" are the only companies for Freenet devices.

Channel table
Freenet channels are within the 2 meter band business radio allocations.

FM-analog mode

Digital Modes

Freenet abroad
Freenet is a national radio allocation that is used in Germany only. Foreign regulatory bodies usually do not permit use of Freenet devices since the frequencies are often already allocated for different radio services. Instead, PMR446 has been harmonised on a European level.
Due to possible interference with Swiss military networks, it is not permitted to use the Freenet frequencies in the Black Forest and on the Swabian Alb at elevations of 600 metres or above.

References

External links
 Frequenzzuteilung für Freenet (PDF-Datei; 12 kB)
 Verfügung 5/2015 (PDF-Datei; 74 kB)

Bandplans